Joelle Tanguy is a French / American diplomat and medical nonprofit executive, currently serving as the Director of External Affairs for the Drugs for Neglected Diseases Initiative. (DNDi).

Background 
Tanguy received her MBA from a joint program between HEC Paris and Stanford.

Career 
Tanguy was a dual-degree graduate of business and computer science, working in computer software sales, when she was offered a sabbatical to hike in the Himalayas. According to a Stanford magazine profile (2000), she applied for a position with Médecins Sans Frontieres after the Armenian earthquake of 1988, which later led to coordinating relief missions in Uganda, Somalia, Zaire, Liberia, and the Balkan peninsula.

Tanguy was the executive director for GAVI, a vaccine alliance, then as under-secretary-general for the International Red Cross and Red Crescent.

In 2018, Tanguy joined the DNDi to help advance the cause of drug development against tropical and rare diseases.

Volunteer service 
In addition to roles with medical and civic organizations, Tanguy serves as an Executive-in-Residence of the Geneva Centre for Security Policy, a United Nations Director for Women, and a board member for Human Rights Watch, Global Fund to Fight TB, AIDS, and Malaria, and the Access to Medicine Index Foundation.

References

Relief Society people
American diplomats
Living people
Year of birth missing (living people)